Igor Gayniachmetovich Badamshin (June 12, 1966 – January 24, 2014) was a Soviet/Russian cross-country skier who competed from 1989 to 1997. He won a bronze medal in the 4 × 10 km relay at the 1993 FIS Nordic World Ski Championships in Falun and earned his best individual finishes of 5th twice at the world championships (1989: 50 km, 1993: 30 km).

Badamashin's best individual finish at the Winter Olympics was 14th at the 50 km event in 1994. His best finish was second place three times, earning it once in 1989 and twice in 1996.

In his later years, Badamshin resided with his wife, triple Olympic champion Nina Gavrylyuk, in the American state of Wisconsin. He died at the age of 47 in 2014, after suffering a heart attack.

Cross-country skiing results
All results are sourced from the International Ski Federation (FIS).

Olympic Games

World Championships
 1 medal – (1 bronze)

World Cup

Season standings

Individual podiums
1 podium

Team podiums
 1 victory 
 7 podiums 

Note:  Until the 1999 World Championships, World Championship races were included in the World Cup scoring system.

References

External links 

1966 births
2014 deaths
Russian male cross-country skiers
Cross-country skiers at the 1994 Winter Olympics
Olympic cross-country skiers of Russia
FIS Nordic World Ski Championships medalists in cross-country skiing
People from Lesnoy, Sverdlovsk Oblast
Sportspeople from Sverdlovsk Oblast